Polo returned to the Olympic program at the 1920 Summer Olympics in Antwerp, after not being contested at the 1912 Games. Four teams competed. Great Britain repeated as Olympic champions (though they had all three teams competing in 1908, so had won then without international competition). Spain took silver. The United States beat Belgium in the bronze medal match.

Background

This was the third time that polo was played at the Olympics; the sport had previously appeared in 1900 and 1908 and would appear again in 1924 and 1936. Each time, the tournament was for men only.

Belgium and Spain made their debut in polo in 1920. Great Britain made its third appearance; it was the only nation to compete in all five editions of the Olympic polo tournament. The United States made its second appearance.

Competition format

The competition was a single-elimination tournament with a bronze medal match. With 4 teams, the tournament began at the semifinals round.

Medalists

The Belgian team finished in fourth place, with Alfred Grisar, Maurice Lysen, Clément Van Der Straten and Gaston Peers de Nieuwburgh representing them.

Bracket

References

 
 

 
1920 Summer Olympics events
1920